Yarck is a town in the upper Goulburn Valley region of Victoria, Australia.

Yarck Post Office opened around February 1877. The railway arrived in November 1890 when the branch line from Tallarook was extended to Merton. The line and the station closed in 1978.

Facilities in the town include a general store, a hotel, two cafes, a book store, and a bakery.

References

External links
 Yarck Township website

Towns in Victoria (Australia)
Shire of Murrindindi